Jaramilloa is a genus of flowering plants in the family Asteraceae.

 Species
Both species are reported only from northern Colombia.
 Jaramilloa hylibates (B.L.Rob.) R.M.King & H.Rob.
 Jaramilloa sanctae-martae R.M.King & H.Rob.

References

Endemic flora of Colombia
Eupatorieae
Asteraceae genera